Frank Belton Bracht (January 7, 1910 – September 26, 1985) was an American film and music editor. He was nominated for the Academy Award for Best Film Editing in 1968 for The Odd Couple.

Selected filmography (as editor)
 White Christmas (1954)
 Funny Face (1957)
 Hud (1963)
 The Odd Couple (1968)
 Plaza Suite (1971)
 Conrack (1974)
 Mandingo (1975)
 The Duchess and the Dirtwater Fox (1976)
 Sidewinder One (1977)
 Goin' Coconuts (1978)
 Something Short of Paradise (1979)

References

External links
 

1910 births
1985 deaths
American film editors